Vasopressin receptor 1A (V1AR), or arginine vasopressin receptor 1A (officially called AVPR1A) is one of the three major receptor types for vasopressin (AVPR1B and AVPR2 being the others), and is present throughout the brain, as well as in the periphery in the liver, kidney, and vasculature.

V1AR is also known as:

 V1a vasopressin receptor
 antidiuretic hormone receptor 1A
 SCCL vasopressin subtype 1a receptor
 V1-vascular vasopressin receptor AVPR1A
 vascular/hepatic-type arginine vasopressin receptor

Structure and function 
Human AVPR1A cDNA is 1472 bp long and encodes a 418 amino-acid long polypeptide which shares 72%, 36%, 37%, and 45% sequence identity with rat Avpr1a, human AVPR2, rat Avpr2, and human oxytocin receptor (OXTR), respectively. AVPR1A is a G-protein coupled receptor (GPCR) with 7 transmembrane domains that couples to Gaq/11 GTP binding proteins, which along with Gbl, activate phospholipase C activity. Clinically, the V1A receptor is related to vasoconstriction compared to the V1B receptor that is more related to ACTH release or the V2 receptor that is linked to the antidiuretic function of ADH.

Ligand binding 

In the N-terminal juxtamembrane segment of the AVPR1A, the glutamate residue at position 54 (E54) and the arginine residue at position 46 (R46) are critical for binding with AVP and AVP agonists, with E54 likely to interact with AVP and R46 to contribute to a conformational switch.

Competitors of [125I]Tyr-Phaa-specific binding to AVPR1A include:

 Linear V1a antagonist phenylacetyl-D-Tyr(Et)-Phe-Gln-Asn-Lys-Pro-Arg-NH2 (Ki = 1.2 ± 0.2 nM)
 Relcovaptan (SR-49059) (Ki = 1.3 ± 0.2 nM)
 AVP (Ki = 1.8 ± 0.4 nM)
 Linear V1a antagonist phenylacetyl-D-Tyr(Et)-Phe-Val-Asn-Lys-Pro-Tyr-NH2 (Ki = 3.0 ± 0.5 nM)
 V2 antagonist d(CH2)5-[D-Ile2, Ile4, Ala-NH2]AVP (Ki = 68 ± 17 nM)
 Oxytocin (Ki = 129 ± 22 nM)

The AVPR1A is endocytosed by binding to beta-arrestin, which dissociates rapidly from AVPR1A to allow it to return to the plasma membrane; however, upon activation, AVPR1A can heterodimerize with AVPR2 to increase beta-arrestin-mediated endocytosis (and intracellular accumulation) of AVPR1A, since AVPR2 is far less likely to dissociate from beta-arrestin.

Role in behavior  

The activity / genetic variants of the AVPR1A gene might be related to generosity and altruistic behavior. Nature News has referred to AVPR1A as the "ruthlessness gene".

Prairie vs. montane voles 

The injection of oxytocin (OXT) vs. oxytocin antagonist (OTA) at birth has sexually dimorphic effects in prairie voles later on in life in various areas of the brain.

Males treated with OXT showed increases in Avpr1a in the ventral pallidum, lateral septum, and cingulate cortex, while females showed decreases; males treated with an OTA showed decreases in AVPR1A in the bed nucleus of the stria terminalis, medial preoptic area of the hypothalamus, and lateral septum.

Although the Avpr1a coding region is 99% identical between prairie and montane voles, and binding and second messenger activity does not differ, patterns of distribution of Avpr1a differ drastically.

Mice 

Male knockout mice in Avpr1a have reduced anxiety-like behavior and greatly impaired social recognition abilities, without any defects in spatial and nonsocial olfactory learning and memory tasks, as measured by the elevated plus maze, light/dark box, Morris water maze, forced swim, baseline acoustic startle and prepulse inhibition (PPI), and olfactory habituation tests. Some studies have shown Avpr1a knockout mice to have deficits in their circadian rhythms and olfaction.

Avpr1a's role in social recognition is particularly important in the lateral septum, as using viral vectors to replace inactivated Avpr1a expression rescues social recognition and increases anxiety-related behavior. However, conflicting results have been found in another study. Also, unlike vasopressin 1b receptor and oxytocin knockout mice, Avpr1a KO mice have a normal Bruce effect (appropriate failure of pregnancy in presence of novel male).

Although activation of Avpr1a is a major mediator of anxiogenesis in males, it is not in females.

Rats 

Avpr1a transcripts are diurnally expressed 12 hours out of phase from vasopressin expression in vasopressin and vasoactive intestinal polypeptide neurons of the suprachiasmatic nucleus in both vasopressin-normal Sprague-Dawley rats, as well as vasopressin-deficient Brattleboro rats.

Rats with reduced Avpr1a in the bed nucleus of the stria terminalis have increased incidences of the isolation potentiated startle, a measure of isolation-induced anxiety.

Subchronic phencyclidine (PCP) treatment (which induces symptoms similar to those of schizophrenia) reduces Avpr1a density in many brain regions, implying there might be a role for AVPR1A in schizophrenia.

Avpr1a is present in the lateral septum, neocortical layer IV, hippocampal formation, amygdalostriatal area, bed nucleus of the stria terminalis, suprachiasmatic nucleus, ventral tegmental area, substantia nigra, superior colliculus, dorsal raphe, nucleus of the solitary tract, spinal cord, and inferior olive, while mRNA transcripts for Avpr1a are found in the olfactory bulb, hippocampal formation, lateral septum, suprachiasmatic nucleus, paraventricular nucleus, anterior hypothalamic area, arcuate nucleus, lateral habenula, ventral tegmental area, substantia nigra (pars compacta), superior colliculus, raphe nuclei, locus coeruleus, inferior olive, choroid plexus, endothelial cells, area postrema and nucleus of the solitary tract.

Humans 

Although vasopressin cell and fibre distribution patterns are highly conserved across species (with centrally projecting systems being sexually dimorphic), the vasopressin receptor AVPR1A distribution differs both between and within species; vasopressin production occurs in the hypothalamus, bed nucleus of the stria terminalis, and the medial amygdala (projecting to the lateral septum and ventral pallidum), while vasopressin binding sites in humans are in the lateral septum, thalamus, basal amygdaloid nucleus, and brainstem, but not cortex.

Human AVPR1A is situated on chromosome 12q14-15, and the promoter region does not have repeat sequences homologous to those found in prairie voles. Three polymorphic repetitive sequences have been found in humans in the 5’ flanking region: RS3, RS1, and a (GT)25 dinucleotide repeat.

A 2015 study found a correlation between AVPR1A expression and predisposition to extra-pair mating in women but not in men.

Polymorphisms

RS3 

The AVPR1A repeat polymorphism RS3 is a complex (CT)4-TT-(CT)8-(GT)24 repeat that is 3625 bp upstream of the transcription start site.

Homozygosity in allele 334 of RS3 is associated in men (but not women) with problems with pair-bonding behavior, measured by traits such as partner bonding, perceived marital problems, marital status, as well as spousal perception of marital quality.

In a study of 203 male and female university students, participants with short (308–325 bp) vs. long (327–343) versions of RS3 were less generous, as measured by lower scores on both money allocations in the dictator game, as well as by self-report with the Bardi-Schwartz Universalism and Benevolence Value-expressive Behavior Scales; although the precise functional significance of longer AVPR1A RS3 repeats is not known, they are associated with higher AVPR1A postmortem hippocampal mRNA levels.

Relative to all other alleles, the 334 allele of RS3 shows overactivation of left amygdala (in response to fearful face stimuli), with longer variants of RS3 additionally associated with stronger amygdala activation.

RS1 

The AVPR1A repeat polymorphism RS1 is a (GATA)14 tetranucleotide repeat that is 553 bp upstream from the transcription start site. Allele 320 in RS1 is associated with increased novelty seeking and decreased harm avoidance; additionally, relative to all other alleles, the 320 allele of RS1 showed significantly less activity in the left amygdala, with shorter variants showing a trend of stronger activity.

Other microsatellites 

The AGAT polymorphism is associated with age of first intercourse in females, with those homozygous for long repeats more likely to have sex before age 15 than any other genotype. However, there is no evidence of preferential transmission of AVPR1A microsatellite repeats to hypersexual or uninhibited people-seeking.

Polymorphisms in AVPR1A have also been shown to be associated with social interaction skills, and have been linked to such diverse traits as dancing and musical ability, altruism and autism.

Chimpanzee populations have individuals with single (only (GT)25 microsatellite) and duplicated (the (GT)25 microsatellite as well as the RS3) alleles, with allele frequencies of 0.795 and 0.205, respectively.

References

Further reading

External links 
 
 
 

G protein-coupled receptors
Biology of bipolar disorder